This is the list of episodes from the television sitcom Car 54, Where Are You?.

Series overview

Episodes

Season 1 (1961–62)

Season 2 (1962–63)

References

External links
 
 TV.com

Lists of American sitcom episodes